Stanislav Sucharda (12 November 1866 in Nová Paka – 5 May 1916 in Prague-Bubeneč), Czech sculptor and professor at the Prague School of Applied Arts from 1899, and a leading figure in the Mánes Union of Fine Arts (S.U.V. Mánes), founded in 1887.

His work can be seen at the František Palacký Monument in the New Town, Prague, and architectural sculpture on several Art Nouveau buildings for Czech architects Osvald Polívka and Jan Kotěra, notably Polívka's New City Hall in Prague. He also designed a monument to Czech composer Karel Bendl which stands in Bubeneč, in the northwest sections of Prague.

Stanislav Sucharda was the brother of sculptor and puppeteer Vojtěch Sucharda and artist Anna Boudová Suchardová.

He is buried at the Vyšehrad Cemetery in Prague.

1866 births
1916 deaths
Czech architectural sculptors
Czech sculptors
Czech medallists
Czech male sculptors
Art Nouveau sculptors
20th-century sculptors
19th-century sculptors
People from Nová Paka
Burials at Vyšehrad Cemetery